Lukas Maria Görtler (born 15 June 1994) is a German professional football midfielder who plays as a midfielder or forward for FC St. Gallen.

Club career
Görtler joined Bayern in 2014, having previously been playing for Eintracht Bamberg. On 2 May 2015, he made his debut for first-team in away match against Bayer Leverkusen.

On 16 June 2015, it was confirmed that Görtler had signed a three-year contract with 2. Bundesliga club 1. FC Kaiserslautern.

On 3 August 2017, it was confirmed that Görtler had signed a three-year contract with Eredivisie club FC Utrecht.

After two seasons with Utrecht, it was announced on 8 July 2019 that Görtler had joined Swiss club FC St. Gallen. Having played as forward for most of his career, he was deployed as a central midfielder at St. Gallen.

References

External links
 
 

1994 births
Living people
Association football midfielders
Association football forwards
German footballers
FC Bayern Munich II players
FC Bayern Munich footballers
1. FC Kaiserslautern players
FC Utrecht players
FC St. Gallen players
Bundesliga players
2. Bundesliga players
Regionalliga players
Eredivisie players
Eerste Divisie players
Swiss Super League players
German expatriate footballers
Expatriate footballers in the Netherlands
Expatriate footballers in Switzerland
Sportspeople from Bamberg
Footballers from Bavaria